

Events

January
 January 1 – The Bornean Sultanate of Brunei gains full independence from the United Kingdom, having become a British protectorate in 1888.
 January 7 – Brunei becomes the sixth member of the Association of Southeast Asian Nations (ASEAN).
 January 10
 The United States and the Vatican (Holy See) restore full diplomatic relations.
 The Victoria Agreement is signed, institutionalising the Indian Ocean Commission.
January 24 – Steve Jobs launches the Macintosh personal computer in the United States.

February
 February 3
 Dr. John Buster and the research team at Harbor–UCLA Medical Center announce history's first embryo transfer from one woman to another, resulting in a live birth.
 STS-41-B: Space Shuttle Challenger is launched on the 10th Space Shuttle mission.
 February 7 – Astronauts Bruce McCandless II and Robert L. Stewart make the first untethered space walk.
 February 8–19 – The 1984 Winter Olympics are held in Sarajevo, Yugoslavia.
 February 13 – Konstantin Chernenko succeeds the late Yuri Andropov as General Secretary of the Communist Party of the Soviet Union.
 February 22 – President of Bangladesh, H M Ershad upgraded South Sylhet's sub-division status to a district and renamed it back to Moulvibazar.
 February 23 – TED (conference) founded.
 February 29 – Canadian prime minister Pierre Trudeau announces his retirement.

March
 March 5 – Iran accuses Iraq of using chemical weapons; the United Nations condemns their use on March 30.
 March 16 – The United States Central Intelligence Agency station chief in Beirut, William Francis Buckley, is kidnapped by the Islamic Jihad Organization and later dies in captivity.
 March 23 – General Rahimuddin Khan becomes the first man in Pakistan's history to rule over two of its provinces, after becoming interim Governor of Sindh.

April
 April 2 – Indian Squadron Leader Rakesh Sharma is launched into space, aboard the Soyuz T-11.
 April 12 – Palestinian gunmen take Israeli bus number 300 hostage. Israeli special forces storm the bus, freeing the hostages (one hostage, two hijackers killed).
 April 13 – India launches Operation Meghdoot, bringing most of the disputed Siachen Glacier region of Kashmir under Indian control and triggering the Siachen conflict with Pakistan.
 April 15 – The first World Youth Day gathering is held in Rome, Italy.

 April 16 – More than one million people, led by Tancredo Neves, occupy the streets of São Paulo to demand direct presidential elections during the Brazilian military government of João Figueiredo. It is the largest protest during the Diretas Já civil unrest, as well as the largest public demonstration in the history of Brazil. The elections are granted in 1989.
 April 19 – Advance Australia Fair is proclaimed as Australia's national anthem, and green and gold as the national colours.
 April 24 – An X-class solar flare erupts on the Sun.
 April 26 – Sultan Iskandar of Johor becomes Yang di-Pertuan Agong of Malaysia, in succession to Sultan Ahmad Shah, whose term ended the previous day.

May
 May 2 – South Africa, Mozambique and Portugal sign an agreement on electricity supply from the Cahora Bassa dam.
 May 5
 The Herreys' song Diggi-Loo Diggi-Ley wins the Eurovision Song Contest for Sweden in Luxembourg. It subsequently became a top ten hit in five European countries.
 The Itaipu Dam, on the border of Brazil and Paraguay after nine years of construction, begins generating power; it was the largest hydroelectric dam in the world at the time.
 May 8 – The Soviet Union announces that it will boycott the 1984 Summer Olympics in Los Angeles.
 May 11 – A transit of Earth from Mars takes place.
 May 12 – The Louisiana World Exposition, also known as the 1984 World's Fair, opens.
 May 13 – Severomorsk Disaster: an explosion at the Soviets' Severomorsk Naval Base destroys two-thirds of all the missiles stockpiled for the Soviets' Northern Fleet. The blast also destroys workshops needed to maintain the missiles as well as hundreds of technicians. Western military experts called it the worst naval disaster the Soviet Navy has suffered since WWII.
 May 14 – The one-dollar coin is introduced in Australia.
 May 23 – A methane gas explosion at Abbeystead water treatment works in Lancashire, UK, kills 16 people.  
 May 30 – Liverpool beat Roma 5-2 after penalties in the final of the 1984 European Cup football tournament.

June
 June 5 – The Indian government begins Operation Blue Star, the planned attack on the Golden Temple in Amritsar.
 June 6 – Tetris is officially released in the Soviet Union on the Electronika 60.
 June 8 – A F5 tornado nearly destroys the town of Barneveld, Wisconsin, killing nine people, injuring nearly 200, and causing over $25,000,000 in damage.
 June 16 – The Canadian entertainment company, Cirque du Soleil, is founded.
 June 22 – Virgin Atlantic makes its inaugural flight.
 June 27 – France beats Spain 2–0 to win Euro 84.
 June 30 – John Turner becomes the 17th Prime Minister of Canada.

July
 July 1
 Liechtenstein becomes the last country in Europe to grant women the right to vote.
 Argentinian footballer Diego Maradona is sold by FC Barcelona (Spain) to S.S.C. Napoli (Italy) for a world record fee at this date of $10.48M (£6.9M).
 July 14 – New Zealand Prime Minister Rob Muldoon calls a snap election and is defeated by opposition Labour leader David Lange.

 July 25 – Salyut 7: cosmonaut Svetlana Savitskaya becomes the first woman to perform a space walk.
 July 28–August 12 – The 1984 Summer Olympics are held in Los Angeles, California.

August
 August 1 – Australian banks are deregulated.
 August 4
 The African republic Upper Volta changes its name to Burkina Faso.
  reaches a record submergence depth of 1,020 meters.
 August 11
 Barefoot South African runner Zola Budd, and Mary Decker of the U.S. collide in the Olympic 3,000 meters final, neither finishing as medallists.
 August 16 – John DeLorean is acquitted of all eight charges of possessing and distributing cocaine.
 August 21 – Half a million people in Manila demonstrate against the regime of Ferdinand Marcos.

 August 30 – STS-41-D: the Space Shuttle Discovery takes off on its maiden voyage.

September
 September 2 – Seven people are shot and killed and 12 wounded in the Milperra massacre, a shootout between the rival motorcycle gangs Bandidos and Comancheros in Sydney, Australia.
 September 4 – The Progressive Conservative Party of Canada, led by Brian Mulroney, wins 211 seats in the House of Commons of Canada, forming the largest majority government in Canadian history.
 September 5
 STS-41-D: the Space Shuttle Discovery lands after its maiden voyage at Edwards Air Force Base in California.
 Western Australia becomes the last Australian state to abolish capital punishment.
 September 7 – An explosion on board a Maltese patrol boat disposing illegal fireworks at sea off Gozo kills seven soldiers and policemen.
 September 14 – P. W. Botha is inaugurated as the first executive State President of South Africa.
 September 14 – Joe Kittinger becomes the first person to fly a gas balloon alone across the Atlantic Ocean.
 September 16 – Edgar Reitz's film series Heimat begins release in Germany.
 September 17 – Brian Mulroney is sworn in as Prime Minister of Canada.
 September 18 – Joe Kittinger becomes the first person to cross the Atlantic, solo, in a hot air balloon.
 September 20 – Hezbollah car-bombs the U.S. Embassy annex in Beirut, killing 24 people.
 September 26 – The United Kingdom and the People's Republic of China sign the initial agreement to return Hong Kong to China in 1997.

October
 October 4 – Tim Macartney-Snape and Greg Mortimer become the first Australians to reach the summit of Mount Everest.
 October 5 – STS-41-G: Marc Garneau becomes the first Canadian in space, aboard the Space Shuttle Challenger.
 October 9 - Thomas the Tank Engine & Friends by Britt Allcroft broadcasts its first 2 episodes in the United Kingdom.
 October 11
 Aboard the Space Shuttle Challenger, astronaut Kathryn D. Sullivan becomes the first American woman to perform a space walk.
 Aeroflot Flight 3352 crashed at Omsk Airport into maintenance vehicles on the runway, killing 174 people on board and 4 on the ground.
 October 12 – The Provisional Irish Republican Army (PIRA) attempts to assassinate Prime Minister Margaret Thatcher and the British Cabinet in the Brighton hotel bombing. The terror attack kills five people and injures 31.
 October 14 – The Detroit Tigers defeat the San Diego Padres in game five of the 1984 World Series to win the franchise's 4th championship.
 October 19 – Polish secret police kidnap Jerzy Popiełuszko, a Catholic priest who supports the Solidarity movement. His body is found in a reservoir 11 days later on October 30.
 October 20 – Monterey Bay Aquarium is opened to the public after seven years of development and construction.
 October 23 – The world learns from moving BBC News television reports presented by Michael Buerk of the famine in Ethiopia, where thousands of people have already died of starvation due to a famine, and as many as 10,000,000 more lives are at risk.
 October 25 – The European Economic Community makes £1.8 million available to help combat the famine in Ethiopia.
 October 31 – Assassination of Indira Gandhi: Prime Minister of India Indira Gandhi is assassinated by her two Sikh security guards in New Delhi. Anti-Sikh riots break out, leaving 10,000 to 20,000 Sikhs dead in Delhi and surrounding areas with majority populations of Hindus. Rajiv Gandhi becomes Prime Minister of India.

November
 November 1–4 – Anti Sikh Mass murder took place in Delhi and various parts of India following the assassination of Prime Minister Indira Gandhi
 November 4 – The Sandinista Front wins the Nicaraguan general elections.
 November 6 – 1984 United States presidential election: Republican President Ronald Reagan defeats Democratic former Vice President Walter F. Mondale with 59% of the popular vote, the highest since Richard Nixon's 61% popular vote victory in 1972. Reagan carries 49 states in the electoral college; Mondale wins only his home state of Minnesota (by a mere 3,761 vote margin) and the District of Columbia.

 November 9–11 – The first Hackers Conference is held.
 November 11 – The Louisiana World Exposition, also known as The 1984 World's Fair, and also the New Orleans World's Fair, and, to the locals, simply as "The Fair" or "Expo 84", closes.
 November 12 – Western Sahara conflict: Morocco leaves the Organization of African Unity in protest at the admission of Western Sahara as a member.
 November 14 – Zamboanga City mayor Cesar Climaco, a prominent critic of the government of Philippine President Ferdinand Marcos, is assassinated in his home city.
 November 19 – A series of explosions at the Pemex Petroleum Storage Facility at San Juan Ixhuatepec, in Mexico City, ignites a major fire and kills about 500 people.
 November 21 – Start of Operation Moses, the evacuation of refugee Beta Israel Ethiopian Jews from Sudan to Israel via Brussels.
 November 25
 Band Aid (assembled by Bob Geldof) records the charity single Do They Know It's Christmas? in London to raise money to combat the famine in Ethiopia. It is released on December 3.
 1984 Uruguayan presidential election: Julio María Sanguinetti is democratically elected President of Uruguay after 12 years of military dictatorship.
 November 28 – Over 250 years after their deaths, William Penn and his wife Hannah Callowhill Penn are made Honorary Citizens of the United States.
 November 30 – Kent and Dollar Farm massacres: the Tamil Tigers begin the purge of the Sinhalese people from North and East Sri Lanka; 127 are killed.

December 

 December 1 – A peace agreement between Kenya and Somalia is signed in the Egyptian capital Cairo. With this agreement, in which Somalia officially renounces its historical territorial claims, relations between the two countries began to improve.
 December 2 – 1984 Australian federal election: Bob Hawke's Labor Government is re-elected with a reduced majority, defeating the Liberal/National Coalition led by Andrew Peacock.
 December 3 – Bhopal disaster: A methyl isocyanate leak from a Union Carbide pesticide plant in Bhopal, Madhya Pradesh, India, kills more than 8,000 people outright and injures over half a million (with more later dying from their injuries the death toll reaches 23,000+) in the worst industrial disaster in history.
 December 4
 Sri Lankan Civil War: Sri Lankan Army soldiers kill 107–150 civilians in Mannar.
 Hezbollah militants hijack a Kuwait Airlines plane and kill 4 passengers.
 December 19 – The People's Republic of China and the United Kingdom sign the Sino-British Joint Declaration on the future of Hong Kong.
 December 20 – Disappearance of Jonelle Matthews from Greeley, Colorado. The cause of death "was a gunshot wound to the head".
 December 22
 Four African-American youths (Barry Allen, Troy Canty, James Ramseur, and Darrell Cabey) board an express train in the Bronx borough of New York City. They attempt to rob Bernhard Goetz, who shoots them. The event starts a national debate about urban crime in the United States.
 In Malta, Prime Minister Dom Mintoff resigns.
 December 28 – A Soviet cruise missile plunges into Inarinjärvi lake in Finnish Lapland. Finnish authorities announce the fact in public on January 3, 1985.

Date unknown
 1983–85 famine in Ethiopia intensifies with renewed drought by mid-year, killing a million people by the end of this year.
 Crack cocaine, a smokeable form of the drug, is first introduced into Los Angeles and soon spreads across the United States in what becomes known as the crack epidemic.
 The Chrysler Corporation introduces the first vehicles to be officially labeled as "minivans". They are branded as the Chrysler Town & Country, Dodge Caravan, and Plymouth Voyager.

Births

January

 January 1 – Paolo Guerrero, Peruvian footballer
 January 6 – Kate McKinnon, American actress and comedian
 January 7 – Max Riemelt, German actor and director
 January 10 
 Marouane Chamakh, French born-Moroccan footballer
 Kalki Koechlin, French-Indian film actress
 January 11 – Mark Forster, German singer-songwriter
 January 15
 Megan Quann, American swimmer
 Victor Rasuk, American actor
 Ben Shapiro, American political commentator and writer
 January 16 – Stephan Lichtsteiner, Swiss footballer
 January 17 
 Calvin Harris, British dance musician
 Filip Hološko, Slovak footballer
 January 18
 Seung-Hui Cho, Korean-born American Virginia Tech massacre gunman (d. 2007)
 Makoto Hasebe, Japanese footballer
 Alaixys Romao, Togolese footballer
 January 19
 Zakia Mrisho Mohamed, Tanzanian long-distance runner
 Aliona Savchenko, Ukrainian-born German pair skater
 Thomas Vanek, Austrian hockey player
 Lil Scrappy, American rapper
 January 21
 Luke Grimes, American actor
 Karim Haggui, Tunisian footballer
 Karen Schwarz, Peruvian actress and TV host
 January 22 – Raica Oliveira, Brazilian supermodel
 January 23 – Arjen Robben, Dutch footballer
 January 24
 Emerse Faé, Ivorian footballer
 Yotam Halperin, Israeli basketball player
 Witold Kiełtyka, Polish musician (d. 2007)
 January 25
 Stefan Kießling, German football player
 Robinho, Brazilian footballer
 January 26 – Luo Xuejuan, Chinese swimmer
 January 28 – Andre Iguodala, American basketball player
 January 29 – Natalie du Toit, South African swimmer
 January 31 – Jeremy Wariner, American track athlete

February

 February 1
 Darren Fletcher, Scottish football player
 Abbi Jacobson, American comedian, writer and actress
 Lee Thompson Young, American actor (d. 2013) 
 February 3
 Elizabeth Holmes, American fraudster who founded Theranos
 Kim Joon, South Korean rapper, actor, and model
 February 4 – Mauricio Pinilla, Chilean footballer
 February 5 – Carlos Tevez, Argentinian football player
 February 6 – Gemma Merna, English actress and model
 February 6 – Trey Hardee, American decathlete and heptahlete
 February 8 
 Manon Nummerdor-Flier, Dutch volleyball player
 Cecily Strong, American actress and comedian
 February 9 
 Liz Carmouche, American mixed martial artist
 Han Geng, Chinese singer in Korea (Super Junior)
 February 10 – Kim Hyo-jin, South Korean actress
 February 11
 Mai Demizu, Japanese announcer
 Aubrey O'Day, American singer and actress
 February 12 
 Caterine Ibargüen, Colombian athlete
 Brad Keselowski, American stock car driver
 February 14 – Edelfa Chiara Masciotta, Italian model and beauty pageant
 February 15
 Doda, Polish singer and model
 Matt and Ross Duffer, American screenwriters and directors
 February 16 – Oussama Mellouli, Tunisian Olympic swimmer
 February 17 – AB de Villiers, South African cricketer
 February 18 – Stéphanie, Hereditary Grand Duchess of Luxembourg
 February 19 – Marissa Meyer, American novelist
 February 20 – Trevor Noah, South African comedian, actor, and television personality
 February 21 – David Odonkor, German footballer
 February 22 
 Tommy Bowe, Irish rugby union player
 Branislav Ivanović, Serbian footballer
 February 24 – Wilson Bethel, American actor
 February 25
 Xing Huina, Chinese athlete
 Filip Šebo, Slovak footballer
 February 26
 Emmanuel Adebayor, Togolese footballer
 Beren Saat, Turkish actress
 February 28 – Karolína Kurková, Czech model
 February 29
 Mark Foster, American singer and composer, frontman of Foster the People
 Alicia Hollowell, American softball pitcher
 Cullen Jones, American Olympic swimmer
 Cam Ward, Canadian hockey player

March

 March 1
 Brandon Stanton, American photographer and blogger
 Alexander Steen, Swedish Ice Hockey player
 March 6 – Daniël de Ridder, Dutch footballer
 March 7
  Steve Burtt Jr., American-Ukrainian basketball player
 Mathieu Flamini, French football player
 Brandon T. Jackson, American stand-up comedian, actor and rapper
 March 8
 Matthew Wong, Canadian artist (d. 2019)
 Ross Taylor, New Zealand cricketer
 March 9 – Julia Mancuso, U.S. Olympic skier
 March 10 – Olivia Wilde, American actress
 March 11 – Tom James, British rower
 March 12
 Jaimie Alexander, American actress
 Shreya Ghoshal, Indian playback singer
 March 13 – Noel Fisher, Canadian actor
 March 14 – Dan Crenshaw, American politician
 March 16
 Michael Ennis, Australian rugby league player
 Hosea Gear, New Zealand Rugby Union player
 March 18 
 Rajeev Ram, American tennis player
 Michael Schmid, Swiss Olympic freestyle skier
 March 19 – Bianca Balti, Italian model
 March 20
 Justine Ezarik, Internet celebrity and actress
 Christy Carlson Romano, American actress and singer
 Fernando Torres, Spanish football player
 March 21 – Sopho Gelovani, Georgian singer
 March 22 
 Piotr Trochowski, Polish born-German footballer
 Zhang Zilin, Chinese actress, singer, fashion model and beauty queen who won Miss China World in 2007
 March 24
 Chris Bosh, American basketball player
 Park Bom, South Korean singer
 March 25 – Katharine McPhee, American Idol finalist
 March 26 
 Stéphanie Lapointe, Canadian singer
 Sara Jean Underwood, American model, television host and actress
 March 29 – Valeria Sorokina, Russian badminton player
 March 30
 Mario Ančić, Croatian tennis player
 Helena Mattsson, Swedish actress
 Justin Moore, American country music singer
 Anna Nalick, American singer
 Samantha Stosur, Australian tennis player

April

 April 1 
 Jonas, Brazilian footballer
 Murali Vijay, Indian cricketer
 April 5
 Marshall Allman, American actor
 Aram Mp3, Armenian singer-songwriter, comedian and showman
 Saba Qamar, Pakistani actress and model
 Phil Wickham, American musician
 April 6 – Siboniso Gaxa, South African footballer
 April 8
 Austin Ejide, Nigerian footballer
 Ezra Koenig, American musician
 April 9
 Michelle Donelan, British politician
 Linda Chung, Canadian TVB actress and singer
 Habiba Ghribi, Tunisian middle distance runner
 Adam Loewen, Canadian pitcher
 April 10 – Mandy Moore, American singer-songwriter, and actress 
 April 11
 Kelli Garner, American actress
 Nikola Karabatić, French handball player
 April 12 – Luisel Ramos, Uruguayan model (d. 2006)
 April 13 – Hiro Mizushima, Japanese actor and writer
 April 14
 Kyle Coetzer, Scottish cricketer
 Adán Sánchez, American singer (d. 2004)
 April 15 – Zizan Razak, Malaysian comedian
 April 16
 Amelia Atwater-Rhodes, American author
 Claire Foy, English actress
 April 17 
Siyar Bahadurzada, Afghan-Dutch mixed martial artist
Rosanna Davison, Irish model, Miss World 2003
 April 18 – America Ferrera, American actress, producer, and director
 April 19
 Lee Da-hae, South Korean actress
 Dmitry Trunenkov, Russian Olympic bobsledder
 April 20 
 Nelson Évora, Ivory Coast-born Portuguese track and field athlete
 Bárbara Lennie, Spanish actress
 April 22 – Amelle Berrabah, British singer 
 April 23 – Alexandra Kosteniuk, Russian chess player
 April 24 
 Germaine de Randamie, Dutch kickboxer and martial artist
 Tyson Ritter, American singer-songwriter 
 April 25 – Melonie Diaz, American actress
 April 26 – Emily Wickersham, American actress
 April 27
 Fabien Gilot, French Olympic swimmer
 Eva Simons, Dutch singer
 Patrick Stump, American musician and singer-songwriter (Fall Out Boy)
 April 29
 Taylor Cole, American actress and model
 Kirby Cote, Canadian Paralympic swimmer
 Paulius Jankūnas, Lithuanian basketball player
 Lina Krasnoroutskaya, Russian tennis player and commentator
 Vassilis Xanthopoulos, Greek basketball player

May

 May 1 
 Sacha Dhawan, British actor
 Kerry Bishé, American actress
 May 3 – Cheryl Burke, American professional dancer
 May 4
 Little Boots, British pop singer
 Sarah Meier, Swiss figure skater
 May 5 – Chris Birchall, Trinidadian footballer
 May 7
 Kevin Owens, Canadian professional wrestler
 Alex Smith, American football player
 May 8  – Martin Compston, Scottish actor and former professional footballer
 May 11 – Andrés Iniesta, Spanish footballer
 May 12 
 Sajjad Anoushiravani, Iranian weightlifter
 Emily Beecham, American-British actress and singer
 May 13 
 Dawn Harper-Nelson, American hurdler
 Hannah New, English actress and model
 May 14
 Gary Ablett Jr., Australian rules footballer
 Olly Murs, English singer
 Hassan Yebda, French born-Algerian footballer
 Mark Zuckerberg, American founder and CEO of Facebook
 May 17
 Jayson Blair, American actor
 Alejandro Edda, Mexican-American actor
 Andreas Kofler, Austrian ski jumper
 Passenger, English singer and songwriter
 Christine Robinson, Canadian water polo player
 May 19 
 Jesús Dátolo, Argentine footballer
 Inna Modja, French-Malian singer
 May 20
 Dilara Kazimova, Azerbaijani singer and actress
 Eunice Kirwa, Kenyan born-Bahraini long distance runner
 Naturi Naughton, American singer and actress
 May 21
 Jackson Pearce, American novelist
 Gary Woodland, American golfer
 May 23 – Adam Wylie, American actor
 May 24 – Monica Bergamelli, Italian artistic gymnast
 May 25
 Kyle Brodziak, Canadian ice hockey player
 Emma Marrone, Italian pop/rock singer
 Kostas Martakis, Greek singer, model and occasional actor
 Nikolai Pokotylo, Russian singer
 Marion Raven, Norwegian singer and songwriter
 Unnur Birna Vilhjálmsdóttir, Miss Iceland, crowned Miss World 2005
 May 29
 Carmelo Anthony, African-American basketball player
 Nia Jax, Australian-born American professional wrestler
 Aleksei Tishchenko, Russian Olympic boxer
 May 31
 Milorad Čavić, Serbian swimmer
 Yael Grobglas, Israeli actress
 Daniela Samulski, German swimmer (d.2018)

June

 June 1 – Naidangiin Tüvshinbayar, Mongolian judoka
 June 4 – Rainie Yang, Taiwanese singer
 June 5 – Iris van Herpen, Dutch fashion designer
 June 8
 Andrea Casiraghi, Prince of Monaco
 Javier Mascherano, Argentinian footballer
 June 9 
 Masoud Shojaei, Iranian footballer
 Wesley Sneijder, Dutch footballer
 June 11 – Vágner Love, Brazilian footballer
 June 13
 Bérengère Schuh, French archer
 Phillip Van Dyke, American actor
 June 15 – Tim Lincecum, American baseball player
 June 16
 Emiri Miyasaka, Japanese model
 Rick Nash, Canadian hockey player
 June 17 – John Gallagher Jr., American actor, singer, and dancer
 June 19 – Paul Dano, American actor and producer
 June 21
 Zabit Samedov, Azerbaijani kickboxer
 Erick Silva, Brazilian mixed martial artist
 June 22 – Janko Tipsarević, Serbian tennis player
 June 23 
 Duffy, Welsh singer
 Du Jing, Chinese badminton player
 June 24
 Javier Ambrossi, Spanish actor, stage director and film director
 Andrea Raggi, Italian footballer
 JJ Redick, American basketball player
 June 25
 Lauren Bush, American model and producer
 Killian Donnelly, Irish musical theatre performer
 June 26
 Raymond Felton, American basketball player
 Aubrey Plaza, American actress
 Deron Williams, American basketball player
 Eddie Wineland, American mixed martial artist
 June 27
 Son Ho-jun, South Korean singer and actor
 Gökhan Inler, Swiss footballer
 Khloé Kardashian, American television personality
 June 30
 Fantasia Barrino, American singer
 Nikos Oikonomopoulos, Greek singer
 Yu Koshikawa, Japanese volleyball player

July

 July 1 – Donald Thomas, Bahamian high jumper
 July 2
 Vinny Magalhães, Brazilian mixed martial artist
 Elise Stefanik, American politician
 Johnny Weir, American figure skater, fashion designer, and television commentator
 July 3 – Syed Rasel, Bangladeshi cricketer
 July 4
 Jin Akanishi, Japanese singer and actor
 Lee Je-hoon, South Korean actor
 July 5
 Danay García, Cuban actress and model
 Yeon Woo-jin, South Korean actor
 Yu Yamada, Japanese model, actress, and singer
 July 6 
 Lauren Harris, British rock musician
 James Holzhauer, American game show champion
 July 7
 Alberto Aquilani, Italian footballer
 Mohammad Ashraful, Bangladeshi cricketer
 Oleksiy Honcharuk, Ukrainian politician
 July 9 – LA Tenorio, Filipino professional basketball player
 July 10
 Mark González, South African-Chilean footballer
 María Julia Mantilla, Peruvian actress, dancer, model, teacher, and beauty queen
 July 11
 Tanith Belbin White, Canadian-American figure skater
 Joe Pavelski, American hockey player
 Serinda Swan, Canadian actress
 Rachael Taylor, Australian actress
 July 12
 Gareth Gates, English singer
 Amanda Hocking, American fantasy novelist
 Michael McGovern, Northern Irish footballer
 Sami Zayn, Syrian Canadian professional wrestler
 July 13 – Pio Marmaï, French actor
 July 14 
 Samir Handanović, Slovene footballer
 Nilmar, Brazilian footballer
 July 15 – Rustam Totrov, Russian Greco-Roman wrestler
 July 18
 Liv Boeree, English poker player and TV presenter
 Josh Harding, Canadian hockey player
 July 19
 Lasse Gjertsen, Norwegian videographer
 Andrea Libman, Canadian actress
 Diana Mocanu, Romanian swimmer
 Zhu Zhu, Chinese actress and singer
 July 21
 Sarah Greene, Irish actress and singer
 Iris Strubegger, Austrian model
 July 22 – Stewart Downing, English footballer
 July 23 – Brandon Roy, American basketball player
 July 26 
 Kyriakos Ioannou, Cypriot high jumper
 Marta Żmuda Trzebiatowska, Polish actress
 July 27 – Taylor Schilling, American actress
 July 28
 Ali Krieger, American soccer player
 Zach Parise, American hockey player
 John David Washington, American actor and former American football player
 July 29 – Osman Chávez, Honduran footballer
 July 30
 Anna Bessonova, Ukrainian rhythmic gymnast
 Gina Rodriguez, American actress and producer

August

 August 1 – Bastian Schweinsteiger, German football player
 August 2 
 Giampaolo Pazzini, Italian footballer
 J. D. Vance, American politician and businessman
 August 3 – Ryan Lochte, American swimmer
 August 5 – Helene Fischer, German singer and entertainer
 August 6 
 Vedad Ibišević, Bosnian footballer
 Maja Ognjenović, Serbian volleyball player
 August 9 – Takaharu Furukawa, Japanese archer
 August 10 – Ryan Eggold, American film and television actor
 August 11
 Mojtaba Abedini, Iranian Olympic fencer
 Melky Cabrera, American baseball player
 Lucas di Grassi, Brazilian racing driver
 Markis Kido, Indonesian badminton player (d.2021)
 August 12 
 Marian Rivera, Spanish born-Filipino actress, model and activist
 Sherone Simpson, Jamaican athlete
 August 13
 Alona Bondarenko, Ukrainian tennis player
 Niko Kranjčar, Croatian football player and coach
 James Morrison, English singer-songwriter and guitarist
 August 14
 Clay Buchholz, American Major League Baseball pitcher
 Giorgio Chiellini, Italian footballer
 Robin Söderling, Swedish tennis player
 August 17 – Liam Heath, British sprint canoeist
 August 21 – Alizée Jacotey, French singer
 August 23 
 Glen Johnson, English footballer
 Ashley Williams, Welsh footballer
 August 24
 Hendra Setiawan, Indonesian badminton player
 Charlie Villanueva, American basketball player 
 Yesung, South Korean singer, songwriter, actor, radio personality and MC
 August 25 – Kenan Sofuoğlu, Turkish professional motorcycle racer
 August 27 – Sulley Muntari, Ghanaian footballer
 August 28 – Sarah Roemer, American model and actress
 August 31 – Charl Schwartzel, South African golfer

September

 September 1 – Joe Trohman, American singer-songwriter, composer, and guitarist (Fall Out Boy)
 September 2 – Danson Tang, Taiwanese actor, model, and singer
 September 3 – Garrett Hedlund, American actor
 September 4 – Yulia Peresild, Russian actress
 Camila Bordonaba, Argentine actress, singer-songwriter, dancer, musician, and former model
 Emma Moffatt, Australian triathlete
 Kyle Mooney, American comedian
 September 6
 Orsi Kocsis, Hungarian model
 Abby Martin, American journalist
 September 7
 Farveez Maharoof, Sri Lankan cricketer
 Kate Miner, American actress and musician
 Miranda, Brazilian footballer
 Vera Zvonareva, Russian tennis player
 September 8 – Daniele Hypolito, Brazilian artistic gymnast
 September 9 – Brad Guzan, American soccer player
 September 10 – Luke Treadaway, English actor and singer
 September 15 – Prince Harry, Duke of Sussex, British Prince
 September 16
 Sabrina Bryan, American actress and singer
 Katie Melua, Georgian-English singer
 September 18
 Nina Arianda, American actress
 Dizzee Rascal, English rapper
 September 19
 Lydia Hearst, American actress and fashion model
 Kevin Zegers, Canadian actor
 September 20
 Brian Joubert, French figure skater
 Soundarya Rajinikanth, Indian graphic designer, producer, and director
 Holly Weber, American actress and model
 September 21 – Ben Wildman-Tobriner, American Olympic swimmer
 September 22
 Theresa Fu, Hong Kong singer and actress
 Godfrey Gao, Taiwanese-Canadian model and actor (d. 2019)
 Thiago Silva, Brazilian footballer
 Laura Vandervoort, Canadian actress
 September 23
 Matt Kemp, American baseball player
 Anneliese van der Pol, Dutch-American actress and singer
 September 24 – Klaudia Jans-Ignacik, Polish tennis player
 September 25
 CariDee English, American fashion model and TV personality
 Siphiwe Tshabalala, South African soccer player
 Annabelle Wallis, English actress
 Zach Woods, American actor and comedian
 September 27 – Avril Lavigne, Canadian rock musician
 September 28
 Helen Oyeyemi, British novelist
 Melody Thornton, American singer 
 Ryan Zimmerman, American baseball player
 September 29 – Per Mertesacker, German football player
 September 30 – Keisha Buchanan, British singer

October

 October 1
 Beck Bennett, American actor and comedian
 Josh Brener, American actor
 Matt Cain, American baseball player
 Mónica Spear, Venezuelan actress, Miss Venezuela 2004 (d. 2014)
 October 2 – Marion Bartoli, French professional tennis player
 October 3
 Ashlee Simpson, American singer and actress
 Yoon Eun-hye, Korean singer, model, actress and entertainer
 Laura Weissbecker, French actress
 Jessica Parker Kennedy, Canadian actress
 October 4
 Lena Katina, Russian singer 
 Álvaro Parente, Portuguese racing driver
 October 5
 Kenwyne Jones, Trinidadian football player and coach
 Glenn McMillan, Australian actor
 Brooke Valentine, American urban musician
 October 6
 Joanna Pacitti, American singer
 Magdalena Frackowiak, Polish model
 Valerie Adams, New Zealand athlete
 October 7  
 Ikuta Toma, Japanese drama actor
 Andy Bean, American actor
 October 10
 Pavel Durov, Russian entrepreneur
 Chiaki Kuriyama, Japanese actress
 Steve Turner, Australian rugby league player
 October 11 
 Martha MacIsaac, Canadian actress
 Jeronimas Milius, Lithuanian singer
 October 12 – Emmanuel Kipchirchir Mutai, Kenyan long-distance runner
 October 13
 Kathrin Fricke, German web- and video-artist, known as Coldmirror
 Anton Kushnir, Belarusian Olympic freestyle skier
 October 15 – Jessie Ware, English singer
 October 16
 Ben Smith, Australian rugby league player
 Shayne Ward, British singer
 October 17
 Chris Lowell, American actor
 Randall Munroe, American programmer and webcomic artist
 October 18
 Hollie Dunaway, American female boxer
 Robert Harting, German discus thrower
 Jared Tallent, Australian race walker
 Esperanza Spalding, American singer
 Lindsey Vonn, American alpine skier
 October 20 – Mitch Lucker, American heavy metal singer (d. 2012)
 October 23
 Izabel Goulart, Brazilian model
 Meghan McCain, American author
 October 24
 Ben Giroux, American actor and director
 Erin Lucas, American actress
 October 25
 Katy Perry, American singer and television judge
 Maria Lvova-Belova, Russian top government official
 October 26
 Sasha Cohen, American figure skater
 Jefferson Farfán, Peruvian footballer
 October 27
 Kelly Osbourne, English singer and television personality
 Irfan Pathan, Indian cricketer
 October 28 – Obafemi Martins, Nigerian footballer
 October 29 – Eric Staal, Canadian hockey player

November

 
 November 1
 Miloš Krasić, Serbian footballer
 Natalia Tena, English actress and singer
 November 2
 Julia Stegner, German model
 Tamara Hope, Canadian actress and singer
 November 3
 Ryo Nishikido, Japanese singer-songwriter and actor 
 Mina Fukui, Japanese actress, tarento and gravure model
 November 4
 Dustin Brown, American hockey player
 Ayila Yussuf, Nigerian footballer
 November 5
 Jon Cornish, Canadian football player
 Tobias Enström, Swedish ice hockey player
 Baruto Kaito, Estonian sumo wrestler
 Eliud Kipchoge, Kenyan long-distance runner
 Nikolay Zherdev, Ukrainian-Russian ice hockey player
 November 7
 Mihkel Aksalu, Estonian footballer
 Jonathan Bornstein, American-Israeli soccer player
 Amelia Vega, Dominican model, actress, author, singer and Miss Universe 2003
 November 8
 Kuntal Chandra, Bangladeshi cricketer (d. 2012)
 Steven Webb, English actor
 November 9
 Delta Goodrem, Australian actress and singer
 Ku Hye-sun, South Korean actress and singer
 November 10
 Britt Irvin, Canadian actress and singer
 Ludovic Obraniak, Polish footballer
 November 11 – Birkir Már Sævarsson, Icelandic footballer
 November 12
 Omarion, American singer-songwriter and actor
 Dara, South Korean singer and model
 Yan Zi, Chinese tennis player
 November 13 – Lucas Barrios, Argentine born-Paraguayan footballer
 November 14 
 Maria Kozhevnikova, Russian politician and actress
 Vincenzo Nibali, Italian professional road bicycle racer
 Marija Šerifović, Serbian singer, Eurovision Song Contest 2007 winner
 November 15 – Hevrin Khalaf, Kurdish-Syrian politician and civil engineer (d. 2019)
 November 17
 Park Han-byul, South Korean actress
 Lauren Maltby, American actress and psychologist
 November 19 – Lindsay Ellingson, American model and businesswoman 
 November 20 – Jeremy Jordan, American actor and singer
 November 21 – Jena Malone, American actress, musician, and photographer
 November 22 – Scarlett Johansson, American actress and singer
 November 23
 Jarah Mariano, American model
 Lucas Grabeel, American actor, singer, songwriter, and producer
 November 24 – Maria Höfl-Riesch, German alpine skier
 November 25
 Ian Lacey, Australian rugby league player
 Gaspard Ulliel, French actor (d. 2022)
 November 26 – Antonio Puerta, Spanish footballer (d. 2007)
 November 27 – Sanna Nielsen, Swedish pop singer
 November 28
 Alan Ritchson, American actor, model, and singer
 Andrew Bogut, Australian basketball player
 Marc-André Fleury, Canadian hockey player
 Trey Songz, African-American singer-songwriter, rapper, record producer, and actor
 Mary Elizabeth Winstead, American actress and singer
 November 29 – Xu Chen, Chinese badminton player
 November 30 
 Alan Hutton, Scottish footballer
 Olga Rypakova, Kazakhstani track and field athlete

December

 December 3 – Avraam Papadopoulos, Greek football player
 December 4 – Lindsay Felton, American actress
 December 6 – Princess Sofia, Duchess of Värmland, Swedish princess
 December 7 – Robert Kubica, Polish Formula One racing driver
 December 8
 Sam Hunt, American singer-songwriter
 December 10 – Tom Hern, New Zealand actor
 December 11
 Xosha Roquemore, American actress
 Sandra Echeverría, Mexican actress, singer and model
 December 12 – Daniel Agger, Danish football (soccer) player
 December 13 – Santi Cazorla, Spanish football player
 December 14
 Chris Brunt, Northern Irish footballer
 Jackson Rathbone, American actor and singer
 Julia Smit, American swimmer
 December 15
 Kirsty Lee Allan, Australian actress and fashion model
 Martin Škrtel, Slovak footballer
 Yu Fengtong, Chinese speed skater
 December 16 – Theo James, English actor and singer
 December 17
 Asuka Fukuda, Japanese singer
 Tennessee Thomas, British-born American drummer and actor
 Shannon Woodward, American actress
 December 20 – Bob Morley, Australian actor
 December 21 – Jemima Sumgong, Kenyan marathon and long distance runner
 December 22
 Basshunter, Swedish singer, record producer and DJ
 Greg Finley, American actor
 December 23 – Alison Sudol, American singer, songwriter, and actress (aka A Fine Frenzy)
 December 24 – Burak Özçivit, Turkish actor and model
 December 25
 Francisco Vargas, Mexican professional boxer
 Jessica Origliasso, Australian singer-songwriter, actress, and fashion designer
 Lisa Origliasso, Australian singer-songwriter, actress, and fashion designer
 December 26 – Jenny Shakeshaft, American actress and model
 December 28 
 Martin Kaymer, German golfer 
 Raditya Dika, Indonesian writer, comedian, and filmmaker
 December 30 – LeBron James, American basketball player
 December 31 – Corey Crawford, Canadian Ice Hockey player

Date unknown
 Pasang Lhamu Sherpa Akita, Nepali Sherpa mountaineer

Deaths

January

 January 1 – Alexis Korner, British blues musician and broadcaster (b. 1928)
 January 5 – Giuseppe Fava, Italian writer (b. 1925)
 January 6 – Ernest Laszlo, Hungarian-born American cinematographer (b. 1898)
 January 7 – Alfred Kastler, French physicist, Nobel Prize laureate (b. 1902)
 January 9 – Sir Deighton Lisle Ward, 4th Governor-General of Barbados (b. 1909)
 January 11 – Jack La Rue, American actor (b. 1902)
 January 13 – Ray Moore, American comic writer (b. 1905)
 January 14
 Brooks Atkinson, American theater critic (b. 1894)
 Saad Haddad, Lebanese military officer and militia leader (b. 1936)
 Ray Kroc, American entrepreneur (b. 1902)
 January 17
 Kostas Giannidis, Greek composer (b. 1903) 
 George Rigaud, Argentinian actor (b. 1905)
 January 20 – Johnny Weissmuller, American swimmer and actor (b. 1904)
 January 21
 Archduke Gottfried of Austria (b. 1902)
 Jackie Wilson, American singer (b. 1934)
 January 22 – Sir Count Michael Gonzi, Maltese Roman Catholic archbishop (b. 1885)
 January 29 – Frances Goodrich, American screenwriter (b. 1890)
 January 30 – Luke Kelly, lead singer of Irish band The Dubliners (b. 1940)
 January 31 – George Harmon Coxe, American writer (b. 1901)

February

 February 5 – El Santo, Mexican professional wrestler and actor (b. 1917)
 February 6 – Jorge Guillén, Spanish poet (b. 1893)
 February 8 
 Karel Miljon, Dutch boxer (b. 1903)
 Philippe Ariès, French medievalist and historian (b. 1914)
 February 9 – Yuri Andropov, General Secretary of the Communist Party of the Soviet Union (b. 1914)
 February 10
 David Von Erich, American professional wrestler (b. 1958)
 Claudia Zobel, Filipina actress (b. 1965)
 February 11 – John Comer, English actor (b. 1924)
 February 12
 Anna Anderson, Pretender to the Russian throne (b. 1896)
 Julio Cortázar, Argentine writer (b. 1914)
 Tom Keating, English art restorer (b. 1917)
 February 13 – Naomi Uemura, Japanese adventurer (b. 1941)
 February 15 – Ethel Merman, American singer and actress (b. 1908)
 February 20 – Giuseppe Colombo, Italian scientist (b. 1920)
 February 21 – Mikhail Sholokhov, Russian writer, Nobel Prize laureate (b. 1905)
 February 22
 Syed Faiz-ul Hassan Shah, Pakistani religious leader of Allo Mahar Shrif. (b. 1911)
 Jessamyn West, American writer. (b. 1902)

March

 March 1 – Jackie Coogan, American actor (b. 1914)
 March 2 – Ganna Walska, Polish-born American opera singer and horticulturist (b. 1887)
 March 5
 Tito Gobbi, Italian operatic baritone (b. 1913)
 William Powell, American actor (b. 1892)
 March 6 
 Martin Niemöller, German theologian and Lutheran pastor (born 1892)
 Henry Wilcoxon, British actor (b. 1905)
 March 10 – June Marlowe, American actress (b. 1903)
 March 12 – Arnold Ridley, English playwright and actor (b. 1896)
 March 14 – Aurelio Peccei, Italian industrialist and philanthropist, co-founder of the Club of Rome (b. 1908)
 March 15 
 Ken Carpenter, American Olympic athlete (b. 1913)
 Konstantin Badygin, Soviet Naval officer and explorer (b. 1910)
 March 16 – John Hoagland, American photographer (b. 1947)
 March 18 – Paul Francis Webster, American lyricist (b. 1907)
 March 23 – Peter Kolosimo, Italian journalist and writer (b. 1922)
 March 24 – Sam Jaffe, American actor (b. 1891)
 March 26 – Ahmed Sékou Touré, Guinean politician, 1st President of Guinea (b. 1922)
 March 27 – Jack Donohue, American film screenwriter and director (b. 1908)
 March 30 – Karl Rahner, German Jesuit priest and theologian (b. 1904)
 March 31 – Jack Howarth, English actor (b. 1896)

April

 April 1
 Marvin Gaye, American singer (b. 1939)
 Elizabeth Goudge, English writer (b. 1900)
 April 5
 Arthur "Bomber" Harris, British air marshal (b. 1892)
 Giuseppe Tucci, Italian scholar of oriental cultures (b. 1894)
 April 7 – Frank Church, American politician, U.S. senator from 1957 to 1981 (b. 1924)
April 8 – Pyotr Kapitsa, Russian physicist, Nobel Prize laureate (b. 1894)
 April 9 – Willem Sandberg, Dutch typographer (b. 1897)
 April 12 – Edward Sokoine, 2nd Prime Minister of Tanzania (b. 1938)
 April 15
 Tommy Cooper, Welsh comedian and magician (b. 1921)
 William Empson, English poet and critic (b. 1906)
 April 16 – Byron Haskin, American film and television director (b. 1899)
 April 17 – Mark W. Clark, American general (b. 1896)
 April 19 – Machito, Cuban jazz musician (b. 1908)
 April 20 – Otto Arosemena, 32nd President of Ecuador (b. 1925)
 April 21 – Marcel Janco, Romanian-Israeli artist (b. 1895)
 April 22 – Ansel Adams, American photographer (b. 1902)
 April 23 – Roland Penrose, English artist, historian and poet (b. 1900)
 April 26
 Count Basie, American musician and composer (b. 1904)
 May McAvoy, American actress (b. 1899)
 April 30 – Rodrigo Lara Bonilla, Colombian lawyer and politician (b. 1946)

May

 May 2
 Jack Barry, American television host and producer (b. 1918)
 Bob Clampett, American cartoonist (b. 1913)
 May 4 – Diana Dors, English actress (b. 1931)
 May 6 – Mary Cain, American newspaper editor and politician (b. 1904)
 May 8 – Lila Wallace, American publisher (b. 1889)
 May 12 – Charlie Stubbs, English footballer (b. 1920)
 May 15 – Lionel Robbins, British economist (b. 1898)
 May 16
 Andy Kaufman, American comedian (b. 1949)
 Irwin Shaw, American author (b. 1913)
 May 19 – Sir John Betjeman, English diplomat and poet (b. 1906)
 May 20 – Ólafur Jóhannesson, 15th Prime Minister of Iceland (b. 1913)
 May 21
 Andrea Leeds, American actress (b. 1914)
 Ann Little, American actress (b. 1891)
 May 22
 Rambai Barni, Queen consort of King Prajadhipok of Thailand (b. 1904)
 Karl-August Fagerholm, 20th Prime Minister of Finland (b. 1901)
 John Marley, American actor (b. 1907)
 May 24 – Vincent J. McMahon, professional wrestling promoter WWF (b. 1914)
 May 26 – Elizabeth Peer, American journalist (b. 1936)
 May 27 – Vasilije Mokranjac, Serbian composer (b. 1923)
 May 28 
 Eric Morecambe, British comedian (b. 1926)
 D'Urville Martin, American actor and director (b. 1939)

June

 June 5 – Ahmad Fuad Mohieddin, 42nd Prime Minister of Egypt (b. 1926)
 June 6 – Jarnail Singh Bhindranwale, Sikh theologian, Most powerful Sikh leader of the 20th century (b. 1947)
 June 11 – Enrico Berlinguer, General Secretary of the Italian Communist Party (b. 1922)
 June 15
 Ned Glass, American actor (b. 1906)
 Meredith Willson, American composer (b. 1902)
 June 19 – Lee Krasner, American painter (b. 1908)
 June 20 – Estelle Winwood, English actress (b. 1883)
 June 22 – Joseph Losey, American film director (b. 1909)
 June 24 – William Keighley, American film director (b. 1889)
 June 25 – Michel Foucault, French philosopher (b. 1926)
 June 26 – Carl Foreman, American screenwriter (b. 1914)
 June 28
 Yigael Yadin, Israeli archeologist, politician and Military Chief of Staff (b. 1917)
 Claude Chevalley, French mathematician (b. 1909)
 June 30
 Henri Fabre, pioneer French aviator & inventor (b. 1882)
 Lillian Hellman, American playwright (b. 1905)

July

 July 1 – Moshé Feldenkrais, Ukrainian founder of the Feldenkrais Method (b. 1904)
 July 3 – Raoul Salan, French general (b. 1899)
 July 7 – Dame Flora Robson, English actress (b. 1902)
 July 8 
 Brassaï, Hungarian-born photographer (b. 1899)
 Claudio Sánchez-Albornoz, Spanish historian and politician (b. 1893)
 July 17 – Karl Wolff, German Nazi SS Officer (b. 1900)
 July 19 – Faina Ranevskaya, Soviet and Russian actress (b. 1896)
 July 20 - Gail Kubik, American composer (b. 1914)
 July 25 – Big Mama Thornton, American singer (b. 1926)
 July 26 – George Gallup, American statistician and opinion pollster (b. 1901)
 July 27 – James Mason, English actor (b. 1909)
 July 28 – Bess Flowers, American actress (b. 1898)

August

 August 2 – Quirino Cristiani, Argentine animated film director (b. 1896)
 August 4 – Mary Miles Minter, American actress (b. 1902)
 August 5 – Richard Burton, Welsh actor (b. 1925)
 August 8 – Richard Deacon, American actor (b. 1922)
 August 11 – Paul Felix Schmidt, Estonian–German chess player (b. 1916)
 August 13
 Clyde Cook, Australian actor (b. 1891)
 Tigran Petrosian, Georgian chess player (b. 1929)
 August 14 – J. B. Priestley, British novelist and playwright (b. 1894)
 August 25
 Truman Capote, American writer (b. 1924)
 Viktor Chukarin, Russian Olympic gymnast (b. 1921)
 August 28 – Mohammed Naguib, 30th Prime Minister of Egypt and 1st President of Egypt (b. 1901)
 August 29 – Pierre Gemayel, Lebanese politician, founder of the Kataeb Party (b. 1905)

September

 September 1 – Madeleine de Bourbon-Busset, Duchess of Parma (b. 1898)
 September 5
 Adam Malik, 3rd Vice President of Indonesia (b. 1917)
 Jane Roberts, American writer (b. 1929)
 September 6 – Ernest Tubb, American singer (b. 1914)
 September 7 – Joe Cronin, American baseball player and member of the MLB Hall of Fame (b. 1906)
 September 8 – Frank Lowson, English Test Cricketer 1951–1955 (b.1925)
 September 9 – Yılmaz Güney, Turkish film director (b. 1937)
 September 10 – Ismael Merlo, Spanish actor (b. 1918)
 September 12 – Yvon Petra, French tennis player (b. 1916)
 September 14
 Richard Brautigan, American counter-culture author (b. 1935)
 Janet Gaynor, American Academy Award-winning actress (b. 1906)
 September 16 – Vincenzo Cotroni, Italian-Canadian mobster (b. 1911)
 September 17 – Richard Basehart, American actor (b. 1914)
 September 20 – Steve Goodman, American folk musician and songwriter (b. 1948)
 September 24 – Neil Hamilton, American actor (b. 1899)
 September 25 – Walter Pidgeon, Canadian actor (b. 1897)
 September 27 – Toke Townley, English actor (b. 1912)

October

	
 October 1
 Walter Alston, American baseball player and manager (Brooklyn and Los Angeles Dodgers) and a member of the MLB Hall of Fame (b. 1911)
 Blagoje Marjanović, Yugoslav football player and manager (b. 1907)
 October 4 – Bernhard, Prince of Saxe-Meiningen (b. 1901)
 October 5 – Leonard Rossiter, British actor (b. 1926)
 October 6 – George Gaylord Simpson, American paleontologist (b. 1902)
 October 13 – George Kelly, American baseball player (New York Giants) and a member of the MLB Hall of Fame (b. 1895)
 October 14 – Sir Martin Ryle, English radio astronomer, recipient of the Nobel Prize in Physics (b. 1918)
 October 16 – Peggy Ann Garner, American actress (b. 1932)
 October 18 – Jon-Erik Hexum, American actor (b. 1957)
 October 19
 Henri Michaux, Belgian writer and painter (b. 1899)
 Jerzy Popiełuszko, Polish Roman Catholic priest and blessed (b. 1947) (Murdered)
 October 20
 Carl Ferdinand Cori, Austrian-born biochemist, recipient of the Nobel Prize in Physiology or Medicine (b. 1896)
 Paul Dirac, British physicist, Nobel Prize laureate (b. 1902)
 October 21 – François Truffaut, French film director (b. 1932)
 October 23
 David Gorcey, American actor (b. 1921)
 Oskar Werner, Austrian actor (b. 1922)
 October 24 – Walter Woolf King, American singer and actor (b. 1899)
 October 25 – Pascale Ogier, French actress (b. 1958)
 October 30 – June Duprez, English actress (b. 1918)
 October 31
 Eduardo De Filippo, Italian actor (b. 1900)
 Indira Gandhi, Indian politician and political figure, 3rd Prime Minister of India (assassinated) (b. 1917)

November

 November 11 – Martin Luther King Sr., American Baptist pastor, missionary, and an early figure in the civil rights movement (b. 1899)
 November 16
 Vic Dickenson, American trombonist (b. 1906)
 Leonard Rose, American cellist (leukemia) (b. 1918)
 November 20
 Trygve Bratteli, Norwegian politician, 19th Prime Minister of Norway (b. 1910)
 Carlo Campanini, Italian actor (b. 1906)

December

 December 4 – Jack Mercer, American voice artist (b. 1910)
 December 7 – Jeanne Cagney, American actress (b. 1919)
 December 8 – Luther Adler, American actor (b. 1903)
 December 9 – Ivor Moreton, British singer and pianist (b. 1908)
 December 11
 Oskar Seidlin, Silesian-born Jewish-American literary scholar (b. 1911)
 George Waggner, American film director (b. 1894)
 December 13 – Clemente de la Cerda, Venezuelan director (b. 1935)
 December 14 – Vicente Aleixandre, Spanish writer, Nobel Prize laureate (b. 1898)
 December 15 – Jan Peerce, American tenor (b. 1904)
 December 16 – J. Roderick MacArthur, American businessman and philanthropist (b. 1920)
 December 20
 Gonzalo Márquez, Venezuelan Major League Baseball player (b. 1946)
 Stanley Milgram, American psychologist (b. 1933)
 Dmitriy Ustinov, Soviet Army officer and Minister of Defense (b. 1908)
 December 24 
 Ian Hendry, English actor (b. 1931)
 Peter Lawford, English-American actor and socialite (b. 1923)
 December 26 – Sheila Andrews, American country music singer (b. 1953)
 December 28 – Sam Peckinpah, American film director (b. 1925)
 December 29 – Leo Robin, American composer (b. 1900)

Nobel Prizes

 Physics – Carlo Rubbia, Simon van der Meer
 Chemistry – Robert Bruce Merrifield
 Medicine – Niels Kaj Jerne, Georges J. F. Köhler, César Milstein
 Literature – Jaroslav Seifert
 Peace – Bishop Desmond Mpilo Tutu
 Bank of Sweden Prize in Economic Sciences in Memory of Alfred Nobel – Richard Stone

References

 
Leap years in the Gregorian calendar